Raaja Raajathan is a 1989 Indian Tamil-language film directed by E. Ramdoss, starring Ramarajan and Gautami. It was released on 11 August 1989.

Plot

Cast 
Ramarajan
Gautami
Goundamani
Senthil
Kitty
Manorama
Srividya
Kovai Sarala
Vennira Aadai Moorthy

Soundtrack 
The music was composed by Ilaiyaraaja.

References

External links 
 

1980 films
1980s Tamil-language films
1989 films
Films directed by E. Ramdoss
Films scored by Ilaiyaraaja